The Scout and Guide movement in Zambia is served by:
 Girl Guides Association of Zambia, member of the World Association of Girl Guides and Girl Scouts
 Zambia Scouts Association, member of the World Organization of the Scout Movement.

International Scouting units in Zambia
In addition, there are American Boy Scouts in Lusaka, linked to the Direct Service branch of the Boy Scouts of America, which supports units around the world.

See also

Scouting in displaced persons camps

References